Little Apple may refer to:

"Little Apple" (song), 2014 song by Chinese group Chopstick Brothers
Little Apple Books, publisher
The Little Apple, nickname of Manhattan, Kansas, United States
HP Little Apple, Saturn CPU

See also
 Big Apple (disambiguation)